SKY Latin America may refer to:

Sky México, a subsidiary of Televisa and Vrio

SKY Brasil, a subsidiary of Vrio